Kim Jong-hyun (born July 21, 1985) is a South Korean sport shooter. He competed at the 2012 Summer Olympics in the Men's 10 metre air rifle, where he did not reach the final.  He was far more successful in the men's 50 metre rifle - three positions event, where he won the silver medal. At the 2016 Olympic Games he also secured a silver medal in 50 m rifle prone.

References

South Korean male sport shooters
1985 births
Living people
Olympic shooters of South Korea
Shooters at the 2012 Summer Olympics
Shooters at the 2016 Summer Olympics
Asian Games medalists in shooting
Olympic silver medalists for South Korea
Olympic medalists in shooting
Medalists at the 2012 Summer Olympics
Medalists at the 2016 Summer Olympics
Shooters at the 2010 Asian Games
Shooters at the 2014 Asian Games
Asian Games gold medalists for South Korea
Asian Games silver medalists for South Korea
Asian Games bronze medalists for South Korea
Medalists at the 2010 Asian Games
Medalists at the 2014 Asian Games
Sportspeople from Gwangju
20th-century South Korean people
21st-century South Korean people